Bülbül Hatun ("Songbird" died  1515) was a consort of Sultan Bayezid II of the Ottoman Empire.

Life
Bülbül Hatun entered in the Bayezid's harem when he was still a prince and the governor of Amasya. She had two children, a son, Şehzade Ahmed, and a daughters, Hundi Sultan, who married Hersekzade Ahmed Pasha. Some indicated her as the mother of Ayşe Sultan and/or Hatice Sultan, also. 

According to Turkish tradition, all princes were expected to work as provincial governors as a part of their training. Ahmed was sent to Çorum in 1480, and then to Amasya, and Bülbül accompanied him.

She built and endowed a mosque and a soup kitchen in Ladik. At Amasya, she built another mosque, a school and a fountain. In Bursa she had endowed and built a religious college. She endowed a portion of her properties to the Enderun mosque in 1505.

In 1512, she built another complex and endowed a significant amount of property for its expenses. She designated her son Ahmed, and upon his death Ahmed's eldest daughter and her daughters, as the administrator of
the endowment. Bülbül's delegation of the regency of the endowment through the matrilineal line after his son Ahmed demonstrated that this endowment was established as a precautionary measure in the event that Ahmed failed in his bid for the sultanate.

In 1513, Fatma Sultan, daughter of Şehzade Mahmud (son of Bayezid II), and her husband Mehmed Çelebi were placed under house arrest following the Kızılbaş leanings. She was only pardoned following Bülbül's intercession.

Death
After the death of Şehzade Ahmed in 1513, Bülbül Hatun came to Bursa. She built a tomb for Ahmed, in which she was too buried at her death in 1515.

Issue
Together with Bayezid, Bülbül had at least two daughters and a son:
 Hatice Sultan (Amasya; 1463 - Bursa; 1500). She married in first time Muderis Kara Mustafa Pasha in 1479 and she had a son, Sultanzade Ahmed Bey and a daughter, Hanzade Hanimsultan. She was widowed in 1483, when her husband was executed on charges of supporting Şehzade Cem's claim to the throne against Bayezid. Hatice remarried the following year to Faik Pasha(died 1499). She died in 1500 and was buried in her mausoleum, built by her son, in Bursa. Hatice built a mosque, school and fountain in Edirnekapi, Constantinople.
Hundi Sultan (Amasya, c.1564 - 1511), married in 1484, Damat Hersekzade Ahmed Pasha and had two sons, Sultanzade Musa Bey and Sultanzade Mustafa Bey, and two daughters, Kamerşah Hanimsultan and Hümaşah Hanimsultan
Şehzade Ahmed (Amasya,  1466 - Yenişehir, 24 March 1513) Governor of Corum 1481-1483 and of Amasya 1483–1513;

References

Sources

 

15th-century consorts of Ottoman sultans
1515 deaths
16th-century consorts of Ottoman sultans